The 1984 United States Senate election in Rhode Island took place on November 6, 1984. Incumbent Democratic U.S. Senator Claiborne Pell successfully sought re-election, defeating Republican Barbara M. Leonard.

Democratic primary

Candidates 
 Claiborne Pell, incumbent Senator

Republican primary

Candidates 
 Barbara Leonard

General election

Results

See also 
  1984 United States Senate elections

References 

Rhode Island
1984
1984 Rhode Island elections